Colchester is a constituency in Essex represented in the House of Commons of the UK Parliament since 2015 by Will Quince, a Conservative.

History
The Parliamentary Borough of Colchester had sent two members to Parliament since the Model Parliament of 1295. In 1885, representation was reduced to one, being one of 36 English boroughs and three Irish boroughs to which this occurred under the Redistribution of Seats Act 1885. Under the Representation of the People Act 1918, the Parliamentary Borough was abolished and replaced with a Division of the County of Essex (later a County Constituency).

The constituency remained virtually unchanged until it was briefly abolished for the 1983 general election following the Third Periodic Review of Westminster Constituencies, but re-established for the 1997 general election as a Borough Constituency by the Fourth Review.

Boundaries and boundary changes

1918–1950: The Borough of Colchester, and the Rural District of Lexden and Winstree except the detached part of the parish of Inworth which was wholly surrounded by the parishes of Great Braxted and Kelvedon.

The area comprising the Rural District of Lexden and Winstree had largely been part of the Harwich Division.

1950–1983: The Borough of Colchester, the Urban District of West Mersea, and the Rural District of Lexden and Winstree.

No changes (the Urban District of West Mersea had been formed as a separate local authority in 1926).

For the 1983 general election, the constituency was abolished, with the northern parts (comprising the majority) forming the bulk of the new constituency of North Colchester. Southern areas were included in the new constituency of South Colchester and Maldon.

1997–2010: The Borough of Colchester wards of Berechurch, Castle, Harbour, Lexden, Mile End, New Town, Prettygate, St Andrew's, St Anne's, St John's, St Mary's, Shrub End, and Stanway.

Re-established from parts of the abolished constituencies of South Colchester and Maldon (Berechurch, Harbour, New Town, Prettygate and Shrub End wards) and North Colchester (remaining wards).

2010–present: The Borough of Colchester wards of Berechurch, Castle, Christ Church, Harbour, Highwoods, Lexden, Mile End, New Town, Prettygate, St Andrew's, St Anne's, St John's, and Shrub End.

Local authority wards redistributed. Minor reduction in electorate, with Stanway ward being included in the new constituency of Witham.

Constituency profile

Once the basis for one or two semi-rural seats, the modern-day Colchester constituency is a compact, urban core, containing the town centre and surrounding neighbourhoods.

The present Colchester constituency most closely resembles the old seat of Colchester North, which was held by the Conservative Bernard Jenkin from 1992 to 1997.

The seat has one of Britain's largest residential military populations.  The non-military vote in Colchester swung further in favour of the Liberal Democrats since 1997 when Bob Russell stood.  He was elected for the party with a small majority. Russell increased his votes and percentage share in three elections. In the 2010 election this was the only non-Conservative seat in Essex. Russell was defeated in the 2015 general election by Conservative Will Quince, by an 11.5% majority. In the 2017 election Quince was re-elected by a slightly decreased margin by percentage (10.6%), with Labour moving into 2nd place after a substantial increase in their vote, meaning this seat is now much more a contest between Labour and the Conservatives for the first time in many years. In the 2019 election, Quince increased his majority to 9,423 or 17.6% in percentage terms.

Members of Parliament

MPs 1295–1640

MPs 1640–1885

Notes

MPs 1885–1983

MPs since 1997

Elections

Elections in the 2010s

Elections in the 2000s

Elections in the 1990s

Elections in the 1970s

Elections in the 1960s

Elections in the 1950s

Elections in the 1940s

General Election 1939/40:

Another General Election was required to take place before the end of 1940. The political parties had been making preparations for an election to take place from 1939 and by the end of this year, the following candidates had been selected; 
Conservative: Oswald Lewis
Labour: Charles Delacourt-Smith

Elections in the 1930s

Elections in the 1920s

Election results 1885–1918

Elections in the 1880s 

Trotter's death a caused a by-election.

Elections in the 1890s

Elections in the 1900s

Elections in the 1910s 

General Election 1914/15:

Another General Election was required to take place before the end of 1915. The political parties had been making preparations for an election to take place and by July 1914, the following candidates had been selected; 
Unionist: Laming Worthington-Evans
Liberal: Arthur Horne Goldfinch
Labour: Robert Morley

Election results 1832–1885

Elections in the 1830s

Elections in the 1840s

Elections in the 1850s
Smyth's resignation caused a by-election.

 

Manners was appointed First Commissioner of Works and Public Buildings, requiring a by-election.

 
 

Manners resigned to contest the 1852 by-election in North Leicestershire, causing a by-election.

Elections in the 1860s

  
 

Miller resigned, causing a by-election.

Elections in the 1870s
Rebow's death caused a by-election.

Elections in the 1880s

Elections before 1832

 Caused by Spottiswoode being unseated on petition

See also
List of parliamentary constituencies in Essex

Notes

References

Sources
Robert Beatson, "A Chronological Register of Both Houses of Parliament" (London: Longman, Hurst, Res & Orme, 1807) A Chronological Register of Both Houses of the British Parliament, from the Union in 1708, to the Third Parliament of the United Kingdom of Great Britain and Ireland, in 1807
D Brunton & D H Pennington, Members of the Long Parliament (London: George Allen & Unwin, 1954)
Cobbett's Parliamentary history of England, from the Norman Conquest in 1066 to the year 1803 (London: Thomas Hansard, 1808) titles A-Z
 F W S Craig, "British Parliamentary Election Results 1832-1885" (2nd edition, Aldershot: Parliamentary Research Services, 1989)
 J E Neale, The Elizabethan House of Commons (London: Jonathan Cape, 1949)
Henry Stooks Smith, The Parliaments of England from 1715 to 1847 (2nd edition, edited by FWS Craig - Chichester: Parliamentary Reference Publications, 1973)
 Victoria County History of Essex online at www.british-history.ac.uk

Politics of Colchester
Parliamentary constituencies in Essex
Constituencies of the Parliament of the United Kingdom established in 1295
Constituencies of the Parliament of the United Kingdom disestablished in 1983
Constituencies of the Parliament of the United Kingdom established in 1997